The 2022 Rio Grande do Sul state election took place in the state of Rio Grande do Sul, Brazil on 2 October 2022. Voters elected a Governor, Vice Governor, one Senator, 31 representatives for the Chamber of Deputies and 55 Legislative Assembly members, with a possible second round to be held on 30 October 2022. Former governor Eduardo Leite, was eligible for a second term and announced that he's running for reelection. 

The 2022 electoral process was marked by the succession to the position held by the incumbent governor, Ranolfo Vieira Júnior, from the Brazilian Social Democracy Party (PSDB), the running mate of Leite in 2018 Rio Grande do Sul gubernatorial election. He took office on 31 March 2022 with Leite's resignation. For the election to the Federal Senate, the seat occupied by Lasier Martins (PODE), who was elected in 2014 by the Democratic Labour Party (PDT), was at dispute.

Electoral calendar

Gubernatorial candidates
The party conventions began on 20 July and continued until 5 August. The following political parties have already confirmed their candidacies. Political parties had until 15 August 2022 to formally register their candidates.

Candidates in runoff

Candidates failing to make runoff 
{| class="wikitable" style="text-align:center;"
! colspan="2" |Party
!Candidate
!Most relevant political office or occupation
! colspan="2" |Party
!Running mate
!Coalition
!Electoral number
!Ref.
|-
| style="background-color:;" |
| style="background:lavender;" | Workers' Party (PT)
| style="background:lavender;" | Edegar Pretto
| State Deputy for Rio Grande do Sul(2011 – present)
| style="background-color:#FFE000;" |
| style="background:lavender;" |Socialism and Liberty Party (PSOL)
| style="background:lavender;" |Pedro Ruas
|
 Brazil of Hope (PT, PCdoB and PV)
 PSOL REDE Federation (PSOL and REDE)
| 13
|
|-
| style="background-color:;" |
| style="background:lavender;" |Progressistas (PP)
| style="background:lavender;" |Luis Carlos Heinze
|Senator for Rio Grande do Sul(2019 – present)
| style="background-color:#003;" |
| style="background:lavender;" |Brazilian Labour Party (PTB)
| style="background:lavender;" |Tanise Sabino|Work and progress
 Progressistas (PP)
 Brazilian Labour Party (PTB)
|11|
|-
| style="background-color:;" |
| style="background:lavender;" |Democratic Labour Party (PDT)
| style="background:lavender;" |Vieira da Cunha|Secretary of Education of the State of Rio Grande do Sul(2015–2016)
|
|TBA
|TBA
|TBA
|12|
|-
| style="background-color:;" |
| style="background:lavender;" | Social Christian Party (PSC)
| style="background:lavender;" | Roberto Argenta|Federal Deputy from Rio Grande do Sul(1999–2003)
| style="background-color:;" |
| style="background:lavender;" |Solidariedade| style="background:lavender;" | Nivea Rosa|
 Social Christian Party (PSC)
 Solidariedade
 Act (AGIR)
|20|
|-
| style="background-color:;" |
| style="background:lavender;" | Brazilian Communist Party (PCB)
| style="background:lavender;" | Carlos Messala|Public servant.
| style="background-color:;" |
| style="background:lavender;" | Brazilian Communist Party (PCB)
| style="background:lavender;" | Edson Canabarro|TBA
|21|
|-
| style="background-color:;" |
| style="background:lavender;" | New Party (NOVO)
| style="background:lavender;" | Ricardo Jobim|Lawyer and entrepreneur.
| style="background-color:;" |
| style="background:lavender;" | New Party (NOVO)
| style="background:lavender;" | Rafael Dresch|None.
|30|
|-
| style="background-color:" |
| style="background:lavender;" | United Socialist Workers' Party (PSTU)
| style="background:lavender;" |  Rejane Oliveira|No prior public office|
|TBA
|TBA
|TBA
|16|
|}

 Withdrawn candidates 

 Ranolfo Vieira Júnior (PSDB) - Former Vice Governor of Rio Grande do Sul 2019–2022 and Governor of Rio Grande do Sul (2022– present). With the return of Eduardo Leite in the race for the government of the State of Rio Grande do Sul, Ranolfo gives up on his candidacy for the state government in an agreement with the former governor. 

 Alceu Moreira (MDB) - Federal Deputy from Rio Grande do Sul (2011 – present) and State president of Brazilian Democratic Movement in Rio Grande do Sul. He announced on March 23, 2022 that he was giving up on his candidacy. In an open letter, Moreira makes indirect but clear criticisms of party colleague Gabriel Souza and the former governor Eduardo Leite (PSDB). The federal deputy's anger comes from an alleged interference by the governor, which would have influenced Souza's decision to run for the MDB's internal primaries. 
 Gabriel Souza (MDB) - State Deputy for Rio Grande do Sul (2015 – present) withdrew his candidacy to run as the vice-governor in Eduardo Leite's coalition, after beating Moreira in the party primaries.

 Romildo Bolzan Júnior (PDT) - Mayor of Osório, Rio Grande do Sul for two periods: 1993–1997 and 2005–2013. President of Grêmio Foot-Ball Porto Alegrense since 2015. Bolzan confirmed on 12 May 2022 that he will remain in charge of the club until the end of the year, when his term ends. That said, he officially withdrew from being a candidate for the state government. He says he will fulfill the mission he has with the football team and that's the reason why he could not accept the invitation of the Democratic Labour Party (PDT). 
 Beto Albuquerque (PSB) - State deputy of Rio Grande do Sul (1991–1999) and Federal deputy from Rio Grande do Sul (1999–2015). Albuquerque announced on the afternoon of July 28, 2022, during a meeting of the Brazilian Socialist Party national executive in Brasília, that he wouldn't be a candidate for the government of Rio Grande do Sul. He stated, however, that he won't support a Workers' Party candidacy. 
 Pedro Ruas (PSOL) - State deputy of Rio Grande do Sul (2015–2019) and councillor of Porto Alegre (1993–2015, 2021 – present). He announced his withdrawal on July 29 to run as the running mate on Edegar Pretto's ticket. 

 Senatorial candidates 
The party conventions began on July 20th and will continue until August 5th. The following political parties have already confirmed their candidacies. Political parties have until August 15, 2022 to formally register their candidates. 

 Confirmed candidates 

 Potential candidates 

 Withdrawn candidates 

 Manuela d'Ávila (PCdoB) - State Deputy of Rio Grande do Sul (2015–2019); Federal Deputy from Rio Grande do Sul (2007–2015); City Councillor of Porto Alegre (2005–2017) and running mate of Fernando Haddad in 2018 Brazilian presidential election.  She reported to the Workers' Party (PT) that she gave up from running for a Senate seat in Rio Grande do Sul. In the message, she claimed to be a victim of political violence and said she feared for the safety of her family, which, according to her, has been a target of threats and persecution by Bolsonaro's supporters. 
 Nelson Marchezan Júnior (PSDB) - Mayor of Porto Alegre (2017–2021); Federal Deputy from Rio Grande do Sul (2011–2017) and State Deputy of Rio Grande do Sul (2007–2011). The former mayor of Porto Alegre says he doesn't intend to run again for any public office because he was disappointed and that he was willing to abandon public life because he understands that opponents and former allies "played dirty" in the 2020 Porto Alegre mayoral election. 
 José Ivo Sartori (MDB) - Governor of Rio Grande do Sul (2015–2019); Mayor of Caxias do Sul (2005–2013); Federal Deputy from Rio Grande do Sul (2003–2005) and State Deputy of Rio Grande do Sul (1983–2003). The former governor didn't present himself as a candidate for the Federal Senate in the party's public notice. 
 Roberto Robaina (PSOL) - Councillor of Porto Alegre (2017 – present). Robaina was nominated as the first candidate for Alternate Senator on Olívio Dutra's ticket, who announced his intention to run for the Senate leading a collective term. If elected, Dutra and the alternates will share the term. 

 Legislative Assembly 
The result of the last state election and the current situation in the Legislative Assembly of Rio Grande do Sul is given below:

 Opinion polls 

 Governor 

 First round 
The first round is scheduled to take place on 2 October 2022. 

 Second round 
The second round (if necessary) is scheduled to take place on 30 October 2022. Lorenzoni vs. BetoLorenzoni vs. LeiteLorenzoni vs. PrettoLorenzoni vs. ManuelaLeite vs. ManuelaLeite vs. PrettoBeto vs. LeiteBeto vs. RanolfoLorenzoni vs. Ranolfo'''

Senator

Results

Governor

Senator

Notes

References

2022 Brazilian gubernatorial elections
2022 elections in Brazil